Macrolema is a genus of leaf beetles in the subfamily Spilopyrinae. It is found in Australia and New Guinea.

Species
 Macrolema aenescens (Bowditch, 1913)
 Macrolema albascutica Reid & Beatson, 2010
 Macrolema atripennis (Bowditch, 1913)
 Macrolema dickdaviesi Reid & Beatson, 2010
 Macrolema giya Reid & Beatson, 2010
 Macrolema karimui Reid & Beatson, 2010
 Macrolema longicornis Jacoby, 1895
 Macrolema metallica (Lea, 1922)
 Macrolema pulchra Reid & Beatson, 2010
 Macrolema quadrivittata (Jacoby, 1898)
 Macrolema submetallica (Jacoby, 1894)
 Macrolema ventralis (Lea, 1921)
 Macrolema vittata Baly, 1861

References

External links
 Australian Faunal Directory – Genus Macrolema Baly, 1861

Chrysomelidae genera
Beetles of Australia
Insects of New Guinea
Taxa named by Joseph Sugar Baly